NA-164 Bahawalpur-I is a constituency for the National Assembly of Pakistan.

Members of Parliament

2018-2022: NA-171 Bahawalpur-II

Election 2002 

General elections were held on 10 Oct 2002. Mian Riaz Hussain Peerzada of National Alliance won by 66,757 votes.

Election 2008 

General elections were held on 18 Feb 2008. Mian Riaz Hussain Peerzada of PML-Q won by 60,456 votes.

Election 2013 

General elections were held on 11 May 2013. Mian Riaz Hussain Peerzada of PML-N won by 74,491 votes and became the  member of National Assembly.

Election 2018 

General elections were held on 25 July 2018.

See also
NA-163 Bahawalnagar-IV
NA-165 Bahawalpur-II

References

External links 
Election result's official website

NA-186